Julie Spalding-Steven (born April 24, 1976) is an American former professional tennis player, coach, and businesswoman.

Biography

Tennis career
Steven grew up in Wichita, Kansas, and had a successful career in junior tennis, culminating in a junior  US Open title. Throughout her career, she played in all 4 grand slams. She had a win over Lindsay Davenport at the 1991 junior US Open, then lost to the same player in the girls' singles final the following year. At the 1992 Wimbledon Championships, she was runner-up in the girls' doubles, partnering Pam Nelson. Her US Open title came in 1993, with Nicole London in the girls' doubles and she also made the singles semifinals that year.

As a professional player, she reached a best singles ranking of 173 in the world and made three US Open appearances as a singles wildcard. In addition to the US Open, she also played in the women's doubles main draws at Wimbledon and the Australian Open. In 1993, she was a member of the Wichita Advantage team which won the World TeamTennis championship. She is the only junior who has ever won the World Team Tennis Championship Her best performances on the WTA Tour was a quarter-final appearance at the 1994 Singapore Classic.

Professional Career
Following her successes in tennis, Steven moved to the coaching space where she coached top juniors and collegiate players in the south Florida area. She led 9 juniors to reach top 10 national rankings and 2 players to win NCAA singles titles. 
In 2019, Steven opened Coral Oaks Tennis and Wellness, where she  coached members in tennis, fitness, and mindset.  In 2023, Steven started PIVOT, a fitness and nutrition  business to help women find purpose and peace.

References

External links
 
 

1976 births
Living people
American female tennis players
Tennis people from Kansas
US Open (tennis) junior champions
Sportspeople from Wichita, Kansas
LGBT tennis players
Lesbian sportswomen
American LGBT sportspeople
Grand Slam (tennis) champions in girls' doubles
21st-century American women